At the end of the 1932 NFL season, the Portsmouth Spartans and the Chicago Bears tied for first place (6–1); under the rules at the time, standings were based on winning percentage, with ties excluded from the calculation. The Spartans and Bears had tied each other twice during the regular season, making the league's only tiebreaker useless. So the league had to make a rule change to allow another game. For the first time, the league played what amounted to a replay game to determine the NFL champion. Coach Ralph Jones led the Bears to a 9–0 victory over Coach Potsy Clark. The game is recorded as a regular season game for the teams' statistics. Three seasons later Coach Clark would lead his team to their first title, when they were the Detroit Lions.
Because it proved so popular, the 1932 NFL "Playoff Game", as it is unofficially called, started a new era for the National Football League. Beginning in the 1933 NFL season, the league was divided into divisions, and the winner of each division would meet in a playoff game to determine the champion.
The first NFL official playoff game was the 1933 NFL Championship Game between the Chicago Bears and New York Giants where Coach George "Papa Bear" Halas beat Hall of Fame Coach Steve Owen. The following list shows the career postseason records for each coach who has recorded a win in the NFL playoffs from 1933.

Champion coaches
Since playoffs began in the 1933 NFL season, the following 58 coaches have led their team to an NFL or AFL title.
Super Bowls before the 1970 AFL–NFL merger are not included in total championship count.

† is a member of the Pro Football Hall of Fame

Winning Coaches

Bill Belichick holds the current NFL record for most playoff games coached (44) and most wins by a head coach (31). Vince Lombardi won 90% of his playoff appearances, the record for coaches with more than three games to their credit.

While many coaches have won playoff games for 2 teams, only two have won a championship for different franchises. Weeb Ewbank won the 1958 and 1959 NFL titles with the Baltimore Colts, then won the 1968 AFL crown and Super Bowl with the New York Jets. The other coach to win a championship with two teams was Don Shula. Shula was an NFL champion in 1968 with the Baltimore Colts, but lost in Super Bowl III to the AFL champs coached by Weeb Ewbank. Coach Shula then led the Miami Dolphins to titles in 1972 and 1973. So far, Shula has coached the only no-loss, no-tie perfect season in NFL history (1972).

This table lists every coach who has won a playoff game in the NFL or AFL.If a coach has led multiple teams to the playoffs, the teams are listed in the order of his playoff appearances.

Sort chart by clicking on heading. Reload page to return to original form.
Sorting 'Teams' in ascending order will list all champion coaches for each team first and in the order they won the title game for their team.

From 1960 to 1969, NFL and AFL Champs are listed.
Super Bowls listed after the 1970 AFL–NFL merger.

†Coach is in the Hall of Fame as a player or a coach

Updated through the 2022-23 playoffs.

Notes
 Does not include Paul Brown's four-year AAFC playoff record of 5–0 or his four consecutive AAFC championships from 1946 to 1949.
 Does not include Ray Flaherty's AAFC playoff record of 0–2 coaching the New York Yankees.
 Does not include Buck Shaw's AAFC record of 1–1 coaching the 49ers.

List of coaches with no playoff victories

This is a list of all those that have coached in playoff games that have no wins. All records can be verified at Pro Football reference.com.

Playoffs
Below is a list of the most playoff appearances by an NFL head coach (among those with 10 or more postseason appearances); those with the same number are listed based on when they first made the playoffs as a head coach. The most is Don Shula with 19 playoff appearances over 33 years of coaching both the Baltimore Colts and Miami Dolphins and Bill Belichick, who's currently tied with Shula with 19 playoff appearances with 27 years of coaching the Cleveland Browns and the New England Patriots. The years listed are the years where the coach listed made the playoffs, not the entire span of the coach's career. Championship (Super Bowl starting in 1966) appearances are also listed, with wins being in bold. Note that only NFL/AFL years are counted, so those from the AAFC in Paul Brown's case are not included.

See also

 List of current National Football League head coaches
 List of National Football League head coach wins leaders
 List of Super Bowl head coaches

References

head coaches
National Football League records and achievements